The 1937 Furman Purple Hurricane football team was an American football team that represented Furman University as a member of the Southern Conference (SoCon) during the 1937 college football season. In their sixth year under head coach Dizzy McLeod, the Purple Hurricane compiled an overall record of 4–3–2 with a conference mark of 1–2–2, and finished eleventh in the SoCon.

Schedule

References

Furman
Furman Paladins football seasons
Furman Purple Hurricane football